Quaternary is a term used in organic chemistry to classify various types of compounds (e. g. amines and ammonium salts).

See also 
 Primary (chemistry)
 Secondary (chemistry)
 Tertiary (chemistry)

References 

Chemical nomenclature